Peng Bo (born February 18, 1981, in Nanchang, Jiangxi) is a Chinese diver who competed at the 2004 Summer Olympics and won the men's 3m springboard diving event with a score of 787.38.

He also competed in the men's synchronised 3m springboard diving event along with his partner Wang Kenan and was placed 8th with a score of 283.89. He and Wang have both won several medals in diving events.

External links
 Profile at the Olympics Database

1981 births
Living people
Divers at the 2004 Summer Olympics
Olympic gold medalists for China
Olympic divers of China
People from Nanchang
Olympic medalists in diving
Chinese male divers
Asian Games medalists in diving
Sportspeople from Jiangxi
Divers at the 2002 Asian Games
Medalists at the 2004 Summer Olympics
Asian Games gold medalists for China
Medalists at the 2002 Asian Games
Universiade medalists in diving
Universiade gold medalists for China
Medalists at the 2001 Summer Universiade
Medalists at the 2003 Summer Universiade
Medalists at the 2005 Summer Universiade
Medalists at the 2007 Summer Universiade
21st-century Chinese people
20th-century Chinese people